Yaqubi is the center of Sabari District in Khost Province, Afghanistan.

See also
 Khost Province

References

External links

Populated places in Khost Province